The Cabinet of the French Community of Belgium is the executive branch of the French Community of Belgium, and it sits in Brussels. It consists of a number of ministers chosen by the Parliament of the French Community and is headed by a Minister-President.

Compositions

Current composition
Following the 2019 Belgian regional elections, a government was formed on 13 September 2019, to be led by liberal Pierre-Yves Jeholet of the MR. The coalition consisted of the  PS (28 seats), the  MR (23 seats) and  Ecolo (16 seats).

Composition 2014–2019 

 On 11 April 2016, Joëlle Milquet resigned as Minister of Compulsory Education, Culture and Child Care as she was accused of creating a conflict of interest in using her ministerial assistants to help her with a new election campaign in 2014. A few days later, Milquet was replaced by Marie-Martine Schyns and Alda Greoli. Schyns took over the Compulsory Education portfolio, which she was already in charge of during the previous legislature. Greoli took over Culture and Child Care from Milquet and also received the Sports portfolio from René Collin, who shifted to Agriculture and Tourism.

Composition 2009–2014

Composition 2004–2009

See also
 Government of Wallonia
 Flemish Government
 Politics and Government of the Brussels-Capital Region

References

External links
 Website of the Government of the French Community 

1981 establishments in Belgium
Politics of the French Community of Belgium
Government of Belgium